William Fermor was an Imperial Russian Army officer best known for leading his country’s army at the Battle of Zorndorf during the Seven Years’ War. His name is sometimes styled Wilhelm Graf von Fermor.

Early life
Fermor was born in 1702 in Pskov, Russia, of Scottish and Lutheran Baltic German descent. He joined the Russian army in 1720 and distinguished himself at the Siege of Danzig during the War of the Polish Succession. He later saw action against the Ottoman Empire and the Finns. He preferred to associate mostly with other Germans in the service of Russia, something which caused resentment among Russian-speaking officers. He was a protégé of Burkhard Christoph von Münnich.

Seven Years’ War

In 1757 Fermor led a Russian force that captured Memel in East Prussia and was present at the Battle of Gross-Jägersdorf.

In 1758 he was appointed to command the Russian forces which had invaded Prussia during the Seven Years' War. He replaced Stepan Fedorovich Apraksin who had displeased Empress Elizabeth. Fermor reversed the previous commander’s policies towards the civilian population of occupied East Prussia, denouncing the previous hard-line stance, and even having proclamations read apologising for it.

On 25 August 1758 he led his army against Frederick the Great at the Battle of Zorndorf. The battle cost both sides heavy casualties. Afterwards, Fermor withdrew his forces eastwards. He was later relieved of his command and served as a subordinate to Pyotr Saltykov during 1759.

In 1760 he was in overall command of Russian forces during the Raid on Berlin, which saw them and their Austrian allies briefly occupy the Prussian capital before withdrawing.

Later life
Following the coup that brought Catherine II to the throne he was made Governor of Smolensk. He died in 1771.

References

Bibliography
 Millar, Simon & Hook, Adam. Zorndorf 1758: Frederick Faces Holy Mother Russia. Osprey, 2003.
 Szabo, Franz A.J. The Seven Years War in Europe, 1756-1763. Pearson, 2008.

1702 births
1771 deaths
Imperial Russian Army generals
Russian military personnel of the War of the Polish Succession
Russian people of Scottish descent
People of the Silesian Wars
Recipients of the Order of the White Eagle (Poland)